If Tomorrow I Were Leaving for Lhasa, I Wouldn't Stay a Minute More... is the second studio album by American post-punk band Red Temple Spirits. It was released in 1989 on the Nate Starkman & Son label, a subsidiary of Fundamental.

Track listing 

Track 11 only appeared on the CD issue.

Critical reception

Personnel 
Adapted from the If Tomorrow I Were Leaving for Lhasa, I Wouldn't Stay a Minute More... liner notes.

Red Temple Spirits
 William Faircloth – vocals, production
 Dino Paredes – bass guitar, production
 Thomas Pierik – drums, production
 Dallas Taylor – guitar, production

Production and additional personnel
 Biff Sanders – assistant production

Release history

References

External links 
 

1989 albums
Red Temple Spirits albums